Essex was a 48-gun third rate frigate built for the navy of the Commonwealth of England by Phineas Pett II at Deptford, and launched in 1653. Following the restoration of the English monarchy in 1660, she was commissioned into the Royal Navy as HMS Essex.

Between 1 June and 4 June (by the Julian Calendar) 1666 Essex fought at the Four Days Battle. On the final day of the engagement, she was captured by the Dutch. By the time of the battle, Essex's armament had been increased to 60 guns.

Notes

References

Lavery, Brian (2003) The Ship of the Line - Volume 1: The development of the battlefleet 1650-1850. Conway Maritime Press. .

Ships of the line of the Royal Navy
Ships of the line of the Dutch Republic
Ships built in Deptford
1650s ships
Captured ships
Ships of the English navy
Speaker-class ships of the line